Jimmy's Stars is a children's historical novel by the American writer Mary Ann Rodman.

It is set in 1943 Pittsburgh, Pennsylvania against the backdrop of World War II and tells the story of eleven-year-old Ellie McKelvey, protagonist of this novel. Her older brother Jimmy, however, is drafted and she and her family struggle to keep up their hope for him.

Reviews
"Packed with intimate details about life in America during World War II, this book will leave readers with a meaningful picture of what it was like to live through those very hard years."

References

2008 American novels
Children's historical novels
Fiction set in 1943
Novels set in Pittsburgh
Novels set during World War II
2008 children's books
Farrar, Straus and Giroux books